Richard Eugene Rogers (born December 12, 1929) is an American former politician in the state of North Carolina. A Democrat from Williamston, North Carolina, he served in the North Carolina House of Representatives for the 6th district. He is a retired academic administrator and former superintendent of Martin County Schools.

References

External links

1929 births
Living people
People from Martin County, North Carolina
University of North Carolina at Chapel Hill alumni
Democratic Party members of the North Carolina House of Representatives
20th-century American politicians
21st-century American politicians